Graciela Alfano (born 14 December 1952) is an Argentine actress and model. She is best known for her appearances in comedies between the late 1970s and early 1980s which made her a sex symbol. She has worked as a judge on Bailando por un sueño in Argentina.

Filmography

Film
 The Great Adventure (1974)
 Los irrompibles (1975)
 El gordo catástrofe (1977)
 El divorcio está de moda (1978)
 Fotógrafo de señoras (1978)
 Los éxitos del amor (1979)
 Custodio de señoras (1979)
 ... y mañana serán hombres (1979)
 La Nona (1979)
 La aventura de los paraguas asesinos (1979)
 Los drogadictos (1979)
 Locos por la música (1980)
 Departamento compartido (1980)
 Tiro al aire (1980)
 Gran valor (1980)
 Las vacaciones del amor (1981)
 La invitación (1982)
 Los superagentes contra los fantasmas (1986)
 Atreverse a la última jugada (1987)	
 Los taxistas del humor (1987)
 Nada por perder (2001)
 Testigo íntimo (2015)
 Mariel espera (2017)

Television
 Mi amigo Andrés (1973)
 Alta comedia (1974)
 Se armó la Alfano (1975)
 Porcelandia (1975)
 Sábados gigantes (Chile, 1975). Guest
 Nosotros (1975–1976)
 El show de Eber y Nélida Lobato (1976)
 Mi querido Luis (1976)
 De pe a pa (1977)
 Invitación a Jamaica (1977)
 Renato (1978)
 El tío Porcel (1978)
 La ciudad de dos hombres (1981)
 Juego de dos (1981–1982)
 Noche de gigantes (Chile, 1982). Guest
 Situación límite (1984)
 Bellezas (1985)
 Mediomundo (Chile, 1985). Guest
 Las gatitas y ratones de Porcel (1986)
 Los taxistas del humor (1986)
 Hombres de ley (1987). Special appearance
 El gran club (1988–1989). TV host
 Atreverse (1990)
 Graciela y Andrés de una a tres (1991–1993). TV host
 Luces y sombras (1992). Special appearance
 Son de diez (1993). Special appearance
 La familia Benvenuto (1994). Guest
 Cha cha cha (1995)
 El periscopio (1996). TV host
 Viva el lunes (Chile, 1996). Guest
 Gigante y usted (Chile, 1996). Guest 
 Una vez más (Chile, 1996). Guest 
 Adrenalina (Chile, 1996). Special appearance
 Graciela de América (1997. TV host
 Teatro en Canal 13 (Chile, 1997). Special appearance
 Noche de ronda (Chile, 1997). Guest
 Gasoleros (1998). Special appearance
 Na' que ver con Chile (Chile, 1998). Special appearance
 Totalmente (1999). Special appearance
 Videomatch (1999). Special appearance
 La Argentina de Tato (1999)
 La Biblia y el calefón (1999)
 Biografías no autorizadas (2000)
 El triciclo (Chile, 2000). Guest
 De pe a pa (Chile, 2000). Guest
 Versus (2000)
 El lunes sin falta (Chile, 2001). Guest
 Aquí se pasa mundial (Chile, 2002). Guest
 Teletón 2002 (Chile, 2002). Guest
 La última tentación (Chile, 2005). Guest
 Intrusos en el espectáculo (2006). Guest
 Patito feo (2007). Special appearance
 Bailando por un Sueño 2007 (2007). Judge
 Un tiempo después (2008). Special appearance
 El Musical de tus Sueños (2009). Judge
 Este es el show (2009). Guest
 Bailando 2010 (2010). Judge
 Bailando 2011 (2011). Judge
 Fort Night Show (2012)
 La pelu (2012). Special appearance (sketch)
  Plan TV (2013)
 Gracias por estar, gracias por venir (2013)
 Secretos verdaderos (2013)
 Bailando 2014 (2014). Replacement judge
 La noche de Mirtha (2015). Guest
 Almorzando con Mirtha Legrand (2015). Guest
 El diario de Mariana (2015). Guest
 Bailando 2016 (2016). Replacement judge
 Este es el show (2016). Guest
 Susana Giménez (2016). Special appearance (sketch)
 Almorzando con Mirtha Legrand (2017). Guest
 Pasapalabra (2017). Guest
 Cortá por Lozano (2017). Guest
 Piriápolis siempre (Uruguay, 2018). Guest
 La noche de Mirtha (2019). Guest
 El diario de Mariana (2019). Guest
 Almorzando con Mirtha Legrand (2019). Guest
 Los ángeles de la mañana (2019). TV panelist
 Todo puede pasar (2020). Judge

References

External links

 

1952 births
20th-century Argentine actresses
21st-century Argentine actresses
Actresses from Buenos Aires
Argentine female models
Argentine film actresses
Argentine musical theatre actresses
Argentine television actresses
Argentine vedettes
Bailando por un Sueño (Argentine TV series) judges
Living people